Emily Burns (born 22 September 1994) is a British singer-songwriter. Her music style is influenced by artists such as Tove Lo, Kehlani, Sigrid and Banks.

Background
Burns was born in Livingston, West Lothian, Scotland, but raised at Rugby, Warwickshire, England, where she attended Rugby High School For Girls

Career 
Burns entered the Live and Unsigned competition in 2010, reaching the final to perform at the indig02. She was subsequently invited to attended a masterclass at Abbey Road Studios, where inhouse producer Rob Cass signed Burns to Cave Productions, leading to the release of the single "Plasters, Glitter and Glue".

She performed at numerous festivals, including a tour of the Czech Republic and appearances on two different stages at the Secret Garden Party. Emily also had a slot on the BBC introducing stage at T in the Park in July 2013, which led to "Plasters, Glitter and Glue" being play listed on BBC Radio 1. Burns also performed on SB.TV and Mahogany Sessions in 2013. Burns then proceeded to play at BBC Radio 1's Big weekend in Middlesbrough in 2019. Burns started working as a receptionist at Abbey Road Studios in 2014, which led to meeting producer Sound Of Fractures, who produced her first major single "Take It Or Leave It", which was released in November 2016. Burns signed to record label 37 Adventures in July 2017 and released her first single with the label, "Bitch", in January 2018 followed by her second single, "Girlfriend At The Time", in March 2018. Burns released her first EP, Seven Scenes From The Same Summer, in July 2018. Burns released two four track EPs throughout 2019, My Town and PDA. She released a third EP, I Love You, You're The Worst, in July 2020, and is set to complete a six date tour throughout the United Kingdom in October.

Discography

Studio albums

Extended plays

References

External links
 

1994 births
Living people
People educated at Rugby High School for Girls
People from Rugby, Warwickshire
21st-century British women singers
British women singer-songwriters